Tien Wong (born 1968 in Hong Kong) is an ophthalmologist and researcher. He studies the association of retinal vascular imaging to determine the risks of a number of common diseases, including diabetes, hypertension, kidney disease and dementia. He is currently a Unit Head of the Retinal Vascular Imaging Centre (RetVIC) within the Centre for Eye Research Australia.

Early life and education

Wong graduated from the National University of Singapore in 1992 and completed his ophthalmology specialty training in 2002. He then went on to complete a Masters in Public Health (1997) and a Ph.D. (2002) from Johns Hopkins University School of Public Health.

External links 
 https://web.archive.org/web/20070611054430/http://cera.unimelb.edu.au/aboutus/staff/bio/wong.html
 http://www.abc.net.au/catalyst/stories/s1790185.htm

Singaporean emigrants to Australia
Australian medical researchers
Johns Hopkins Bloomberg School of Public Health alumni
Living people
National University of Singapore alumni
Australian public health doctors
Australian ophthalmologists
1968 births